Baiyun railway station may refer to:

 , a railway station in Holingol, Tongliao, Inner Mongolia, China
 Guangzhou Baiyun railway station, also known as Tangxi railway station, a railway station in Baiyun District, Guangzhou, Guangdong Province, China

See also
 , or Bayan'obo railway station, in Bayan Obo Mining District, Baotou City, Inner Mongolia, China